Bob DiLuca (born 30 August 1946) is a Canadian former international soccer player who played as a defender and midfielder.

Early and personal life
DiLuca was born in Italy and was raised in Belgium and Canada.

Career

DiLuca played for Toronto Hawks, Rochester Lancers, Toronto Metros and Connecticut Yankees.

He made 7 appearances for the Canada Olympic team in 1967, and 4 appearances for the senior team in 1968. He represented Canada at the 1967 Pan American Games.

References

1946 births
Living people
Canadian soccer players
Canadian expatriate soccer players
Expatriate soccer players in the United States
Canadian expatriate sportspeople in the United States
Canada men's international soccer players
Pan American Games competitors for Canada
Footballers at the 1967 Pan American Games
Rochester Lancers (1967–1980) players
Toronto Blizzard (1971–1984) players
North American Soccer League (1968–1984) players
American Soccer League (1933–1983) players
Association football defenders
Association football midfielders
Italian emigrants to Canada